Robert Elmer Scherbarth (January 18, 1926 – January 1, 2009) was a  catcher in Major League Baseball who played briefly for the Boston Red Sox during the  season. Listed at 6' 0", 180 lb., Scherbarth batted and threw right-handed. He was born in Milwaukee, Wisconsin.

Like Moonlight Graham from Field of Dreams fame, Scherbarth was one of many players since 1900 who appeared in a game but never had a plate appearance. He made his debut on April 23, 1950 as a defensive replacement in the 8th inning for Birdie Tebbetts. Scherbarth neither batted nor had a fielding chance during his debut and never appeared in another Major League game.

He spent his entire career in the Red Sox organization, including three seasons for their top farm team, the Louisville Colonels. After his baseball career, Scherbarth went into the printing business.

Scherbarth died in Presque Isle, Wisconsin, at the age of 83.

See also
1950 Boston Red Sox season

External links

Retrosheet
Baseball Almanac - Obituary

1926 births
2009 deaths
Boston Red Sox players
Major League Baseball catchers
Baseball players from Milwaukee
Roanoke Red Sox players
El Paso Texans players
San Jose Red Sox players
Scranton Red Sox players
Louisville Colonels (minor league) players
Albany Senators players
Birmingham Barons players